Bahadurgarh City metro station (formerly known as Bus Stand metro station) is a station on the Green Line of the Delhi Metro and is located in the Bahadurgarh town in Haryana. It is an elevated station and opened in 24 June 2018.

Station layout

Facilities

List of available ATM at Bus Stand metro station are

See also
List of Delhi Metro stations
Transport in Delhi
Delhi Metro Rail Corporation
Delhi Suburban Railway
List of rapid transit systems in India

References

External links

 Delhi Metro Rail Corporation Ltd. (Official site) 
 Delhi Metro Annual Reports
 
 UrbanRail.Net – descriptions of all metro systems in the world, each with a schematic map showing all stations.

Delhi Metro stations
Railway stations in Jhajjar district